"We Kiss in a Shadow" is a show tune from the 1951 Rodgers and Hammerstein musical, The King and I.

In this song, Tuptim and Lun Tha declare their love for each other, even though they fear that the King of Siam will learn of it.

In the original Broadway production it was performed by Doretta Morrow and Larry Douglas.  In the 1956 film version it was sung by Reuben Fuentes, dubbing for Carlos Rivas, and Leona Gordon dubbing for Rita Moreno.

Recorded versions
June Christy
Holly Cole
Perry Como recorded on March 20, 1951
Vic Damone recorded on May 2, 1958
Sammy Davis Jr.
Doris Day
Martin Denny, Hypnotique, 1958
Red Garland Trio
Earl Grant
Debbie Harwood, Soothe Me, 2004
Ahmad Jamal, 1961, 1962
André Kostelanetz
Kate McGarry
Dave McKenna
Doretta Morrow and Larry Douglas on the original cast album, recorded on April 16, 1951
Cliff Richard, 1961
Sonny Rollins
The San Francisco Gay Men's Chorus, 1981
Neil Sedaka (Oh! Carol: The Complete Recordings (CD 2 of 8))
Frank Sinatra recorded on March 2, 1951
Barbra Streisand, The Broadway Album, 1985
Andy Williams, Andy Williams Sings Rodgers and Hammerstein, 1958

References

Songs about kissing
1951 songs
Songs with music by Richard Rodgers
Songs with lyrics by Oscar Hammerstein II
Andy Williams songs
Songs from The King and I